The Fear of Missing Out (stylised as thefearofmissingout) is the second studio album by the alternative rock group thenewno2. H.O.T. Records released it on 31 July 2012. The album was produced by band members Dhani Harrison and Paul Hicks using the name "pHd".

As part of the promotion for the album, thenewno2 released the track "Make It Home" on the band's Facebook page as well as to members of the band's website e-mail listing, with the publication Rolling Stone additionally receiving the single. The album received generally positive reviews. Greg Kot of the Chicago Tribune described its music as "appropriately fidgety and restless, a beehive of sound that almost subliminally coalesces into songs".

Track listing

References

2012 albums
Thenewno2 albums